Emporomyia is a genus of flies in the family Tachinidae comprising two species:

Emporomyia caucasica Richter, 1981
Emporomyia kaufmanni Brauer & von Bergenstamm, 1891

References

Tachinidae